Youth is the third studio album by British rapper Tinie Tempah, released on 14 April 2017 by Parlophone and Disturbing London.

Singles
The first single from Youth, "Not Letting Go", featured vocals from Jess Glynne and was released in the United Kingdom on 19 June 2015, the single debuted at number one on the UK Singles Chart. In February, "Girls Like" featuring Zara Larsson was released as the second single. "Mamacita" featuring Wizkid was released on 8 July 2016 as the third single from the album. "Text from Your Ex" and "Chasing Flies" were released as the album's next singles on 20 January 2017. "Find Me" featuring Jake Bugg was released as a single on 7 April 2017. Despite issuing four top 40 singles, the album would exit the UK Albums Chart after three weeks.

Four more singles from Youth were released in 2018: "Cameras" featuring Jake Bugg on 17 January, "So Close" featuring Guy Sebastian and Bugzy Malone on 8 May, "They Don't Know" featuring Kid Ink, Stefflon Don and AoD on 18 September and "Not for the Radio" featuring MNEK on 19 December.

Track listing

Notes
 Credits are adapted from the album's liner notes.
  – co-producer
  – additional production

Charts

Certifications

Release history

References

2017 albums
Tinie Tempah albums
Parlophone albums
Albums produced by Grades
Albums produced by MNEK